United States gubernatorial elections were held on November 2, 1976, in 14 states and one territory. Democrats achieved a net gain of one in these elections. This coincided with the House, Senate elections and the presidential election.

This was the last year in which Illinois held a gubernatorial election on the same year as the presidential election. The state of Illinois moved its gubernatorial election date to midterm congressional election years. As a result, the governor elected this year, served a term of only two years.

Election results
A bolded state name features an article about the specific election.

See also
1976 United States elections
1976 United States presidential election
1976 United States Senate elections
1976 United States House of Representatives elections

References

 
November 1976 events in the United States